Giovanni Domenico Maraldi (17 April 1709 – 14 November 1788) was an Italian-born astronomer, nephew of Giacomo F. Maraldi. 

Born at Perinaldo, Liguria, Maraldi came to Paris in 1727 and became a member of the French Academy of Sciences in 1731. There, while observing Comet De Chéseaux with Jacques Cassini in 1746, he discovered two "nebulous stars", which later turned out to be globular clusters M15 and M2. Maraldi retired to Perinaldo, Italy in 1772. He was posthumously honored, along with his uncle, by the naming of lunar crater Maraldi in 1935.

1709 births
1788 deaths
People from the Province of Imperia
18th-century French astronomers
18th-century Italian astronomers
Members of the French Academy of Sciences